Bagh-e Hutk (also Romanized as 'Bāgh-e Hūtk and Bāgh Hūtk; also known Bāgh Hūtak and Bāghuk) is a village in Sirch Rural District, Shahdad District, Kerman County, Kerman Province, Iran. At the 2006 census, its population was 155, in 42 families.

References 

Populated places in Kerman County